A rabbit hole is a rabbit burrow.

Rabbit hole or Rabbit Hole may also refer to:

Generic usages   
 Rabbit hole (or rabbit-hole,  or rabbithole), unknown, mentally deranging, or disorienting thing (evoking the animal burrow in Alice's Adventures in Wonderland)
 Psychedelic experience (more specific instance of the literary reference)

Arts and entertainment 

Rabbit Hole (play), 2005 play by David Lindsay-Abaire
Rabbit Hole (2010 film), a drama film starring Nicole Kidman, based on the play of the same name
Rabbit Hole Ensemble, theatre company in New York City
Rabbit hole, initial page or clue, in an alternate reality game, that brings the player into its fictional world
Rabbit Hole (2017 film), a Malayalam short-film
Rabbit Hole (TV series), an American streaming television spy series on Paramount+
 "The Rabbit Hole", episode of Batwoman
 "Rabbit Hole", song by Blink-182 from their 2016 album California

Other media 
Wiki rabbit hole, the reading pattern of a person browsing Wikipedia articles through their hyperlinks

See also
 Down the Rabbit Hole (disambiguation)